Seong Moy (April 12, 1921 – June 9, 2013) was an American painter and printmaker.  Moy was born in a small town outside of Canton, China; he emigrated to the United States at the age of 10 in 1931, and joined other members of his family who had settled in St. Paul, Minnesota.  During this time, Moy attended school during the day, and trained in his uncle's restaurant as an assistant chef when not in school.  In 1934, Moy was introduced to art classes at the WPA Federal Art Project School through a friend.  For the next few years, Moy studied art first at the Federal Art Project, and later at the St. Paul School of Art under Cameron Booth, and the WPA Graphic Workshop at the Walker Art Center in Minneapolis, MN. Advisors recognized his talent and permitted him to take more classes while maintaining a job.

In 1941 he moved to New York City where he was awarded a scholarship to study at the Art Students League of New York and the Hoffman School of Art. This lasted until the fall of 1942, when he enlisted with the United States Army Air Forces, serving in the China-India-Burma Theater as an aerial reconnaissance photographer with the 14th Air Force, the "Flying Tigers".

After the war Moy married and brought his wife Sui Yung to New York. He returned to the Art Students League on the G.I. Bill and re-established his relationship with Cameron Booth, who was now teaching in New York. Moy experimented with printmaking at the Atelier 17 and Robert Blackburn Printmaking Workshop in New York.

In the 1950s, Moy became a professor, teaching almost forty years at colleges, universities, and institutions:
 Cooper Union
 Pratt Graphic Arts Center
 Columbia University
 New York University
 Smith College
 Vassar College
 Provincetown, Massachusetts

In 1955 Moy won a Guggenheim Fellowship.  His woodcuts from this time are notable in their use of subject matter from Chinese classics, combined with the formal techniques of Abstract Expressionism.  For example, his woodcut Inscription of T'Chao Pae #II (1952) explores the potential of archaic Chinese calligraphy, illustrating the artist's aim, in his own words, to "recreate in the abstract idiom of contemporary time some of the ideas of ancient Chinese art forms."

He returned to China at the age of 85, in 2008, with his wife, daughters and grandchildren to the rural villages where he and his wife were born in the 1920s. He had a great effect on his family and many who knew him in his life. Moy died in New York on June 9, 2013. He was survived by his wife of sixty six years, Sui Yung, his daughters, Jacqueline and Adrienne, and two grandchildren, Eamon and Fiona.

His work can be found in the permanent collections of a number of museums in the United States, including the Brooklyn Museum, the Metropolitan Museum of Art, the Museum of Modern Art, the Whitney Museum of American Art, the Indianapolis Museum of Art, the Vero Beach Museum of Art, the University of Michigan Museum of Art, the Philadelphia Museum of Art, and the Smithsonian American Art Museum.

Fellowships 
In 1941, Moy attended to the Art Students League in New York by earning a scholarship. He studied painting and printmaking under Vaclav Vytlacil and Will Barnet. He also won another scholarship to the Hans Hofmann School of Art.

In 1948, Moy was awarded a fellowship to study printmaking at Stanley William Hayter's legendary Atelier 17 graphic arts studio which is in New York. Although it was the ideal environment for Moy, he needed a studio for printmaking. Moy described Atelier 17 as“an exchange of points of view, exchange of ideas, what one is trying to do and searching for some newness in technical innovations to fit in with a situation.”In 1950: Moy received a Whitney Fellowship, the biggest award of his career. Consequently, he was suggested to visit artist position at the University of Minnesota, which is the place that he began to teach. Moy went on to teach at the University of Indiana, Smith, Vassar, and Columbia.

In 1955, Moy won a Guggenheim Fellowship. His woodcuts from this time are notable in their use of subject matter from Chinese classics, combined with the formal techniques of Abstract Expressionism. For example, his woodcut Inscription of T'Chao Pae #II (1952) explores the potential of archaic Chinese calligraphy, illustrating the artist's aim, in his own words, to "recreate in the abstract idiom of contemporary time some of the ideas of ancient Chinese art forms."

Between 1970 and 1989, Moy served as Professor of Art at City College of New York, and as an instructor at the Art Students League teaching for more than twenty years.

Selected works 
 BLACK SHORE DUNES ca. 1955-1965 brush and ink and ink wash on paper
 EAST GATES n.d. etching on paper
 PORTHOLE n.d. etching on paper
 NUDE #1 1967 pen and ink and ink wash on paper
 FLOATING ISLAND n.d. color woodcut on paper
 THE BLACK GATES n.d. etching on paper
 THE ROYAL FAMILY 1952 color woodcut on paper
 THE YELLOW CHAMBER n.d. color woodcut on paper
 INSCRIPTION OF JO PUA 1958 color woodcut on paper
 URGULL #2 n.d. color woodcut on paper
 YEN SHENG 1952 color woodcut on paper
 SAND PIPERS ca. 1960 color woodcut on paper
 CAPE COD LANDSCAPE  ca. 1955-1965 brush and ink and ink wash on paper
 THE WANTON ALCHEMIST #1 1951 color woodcut on paper
 KUANG KUNG 1952 color woodcut on paper
 SPRING SONG 1955 brush and ink and ink wash on paper
 CAPE POINT n.d. color lithograph on paper
 BLACK STONE AND RED PEBBLE ca. 1970s color woodcut on paper
 LITTLE ACT ON HORSEBACK 1949 color woodcut on paper
 TIMELESS IMPRINTS 1961 color woodcut on paper
 NASSAU COUNTY #1 1961 color woodcut on paper
 NUDE #2 1967 pen and ink and ink wash on paper
 TWO FIGURES 1966 pen and ink and ink wash on paper
 NASSAU COUNTY #2 n.d. color woodcut on paper
 ROCK GARDEN 1962 color woodcut on paper
 THE COCK FIGHT 1955 ink wash on paper
 NETS ca. 1955-1965 ink wash, brush and ink and pastel on paper
 VIS-A-VIS 1962 color woodcut on paper
 THE COURT OF SILENCES #1 n.d. color woodcut on paper
 THE COURT OF SILENCE n.d. color woodcut on paper
 WINTER'S PATH 1965 color woodcut on paper
 LILY POND 1960 ink wash and pencil on paper
 COURT OF SILENCE #2 n.d. color woodcut on paper
 DANCER IN MOTION 1952 color woodcut on paper
 MOTHER AND CHILD 1963 color woodcut on paper
 NIGHT GLOW n.d. color etching on paper

References

Further reading
 Hallmark, Kara Kelley, Encyclopedia of Asian American Artists, Greenwood Press, 2007, 131-134.
 Wechsler, Jeffrey, ed. Asian Traditions Modern Expressions, Harry N. Abrams Inc, 1997.

External links
 The Seong Moy Online Catalog Raisonné
 An interview of Seong Moy conducted 1971 Jan. 18-28, by Paul Cummings, for the Archives of American Art

1921 births
2013 deaths
Abstract expressionist artists
20th-century American painters
American male painters
21st-century American painters
American printmakers
Artists from Guangzhou
Artists from New York (state)
Artists from Saint Paul, Minnesota
United States Army Air Forces soldiers
American people of Chinese descent
Republic of China (1912–1949) emigrants to the United States
Atelier 17 alumni
American artists of Asian descent
Flying Tigers
United States Army Air Forces personnel of World War II
20th-century American male artists